Zhoukoudian Area is a town and an area located on the east Fangshan District, Beijing, China. It borders Nanjiao and Fozizhuang Townships to its north, Xiangyang, Chengguan and Yingfeng Subdistricts to its east, Shilou and Hangcunhe Towns to its south, and Xiayunling Town to its west. Its population was 41,868 in the 2020 census.

History

Administrative Divisions 

In 2021, Zhoukoudian Area was formed by 29 subdivisions, of those 5 were communities and 24 were villages:

Landmark 
 Zhoukoudian Peking Man Site

See also 
 List of township-level divisions of Beijing

References 

Fangshan District
Towns in Beijing
Areas of Beijing